Yasokjin, Royal Consort Ui (Hangul: 야속진 의비, Hanja: 也速眞 懿妃; died 1316), was a Mongol-born woman who became the second wife of Chungseon of Goryeo. Although she was a Mongol ethnic, she was not a member of the Yuan imperial clan. As her second son was born in 1294, it seems like she became Chungseon's consort before that. She died in 1316 (3rd year of her son's reign) whilst in Yuan. On her death, she was granted the posthumous name of Royal Consort Ui, by which she was more commonly known.

Burial and funeral
As the preparations for Yasokjin's burial had not been completed in Goryeo, her body was cremated and buried in Yuan by the Goryeo official Gim-Yi, who visited her grave every month to present offerings of meat and wine. After three years, the King wanted to move his mother to a burial site on West Mountain near Khanbaliq, a move that Gim opposed. Gim then paid a diviner to tell the King that if one is enshrined in one's own country, there will be no disaster later.' Her body then brought to Goryeo on 3rd days 8th months (Lunar calendar) and her funeral was held on 20th days 8th months (Lunar calendar). The King was persuaded and had Yasokjin's ashes returned to Goryeo, then buried at Yeolleung (연릉, 衍陵) which the preparation of the tomb is 3 years after her death. Her spirit was through "Cheongun Temple" (청운사, 靑雲寺) and was enshrined in "Myoryeon Temple" (묘련사, 妙蓮寺).

References

1316 deaths
Year of birth unknown
Mongol consorts of the Goryeo Dynasty
14th-century women
Yuan dynasty people
Consorts of Chungseon of Goryeo